Walsum may refer to:

 Gerard van Walsum, mayor of Rotterdam
 Peter van Walsum, Dutch diplomat
 Walsum, Duisburg, a district of Duisburg, Germany
 Walsum power plant, in Duisburg, Germany